Conchita Martínez won in the final 6–1, 6–2 against Barbara Paulus.

Seeds
A champion seed is indicated in bold text while text in italics indicates the round in which that seed was eliminated.

  Katerina Maleeva (semifinals)
  Barbara Paulus (final)
  Sabrina Goleš (quarterfinals)
  Angeliki Kanellopoulou (first round)
  Sandra Wasserman (quarterfinals)
  Conchita Martínez (champion)
  Ann Devries (semifinals)
  Iva Budařová (quarterfinals)

Draw

References
 1988 Vitosha New Otani Open Draw

Vitosha New Otani Open
1988 WTA Tour